Qarahjah Veran-e Olya (also Romanized as Qarahjah Verān-e ‘Olyā; also known as Qarahchah Verān-e Bālā, Qarahchah Verān-e ‘Olyā, and Qarehchah Verān-e Bālā) is a village in Chaldoran-e Jonubi Rural District, in the Central District of Chaldoran County, West Azerbaijan Province, Iran. At the 2006 census, its population was 166, in 22 families.

References 

Populated places in Chaldoran County